No Responders Left Behind is a Canadian-American documentary television film, directed by Rob Lindsay and released in 2021. The film profiles the efforts of John Feal and Jon Stewart to advocate for passage and maintenance of the James Zadroga 9/11 Health and Compensation Act to compensate and assist first responders who have suffered a myriad of health problems relating to the September 11 attacks.

The film premiered September 9, 2021 on Discovery+.

The film was a Canadian Screen Award nominee for the Donald Brittain Award for best social or political documentary at the 10th Canadian Screen Awards in 2022.

References

External links
 
 

2021 films
2021 documentary films
American documentary television films
Canadian documentary television films
2020s Canadian films
2020s American films